Bonnetia fasciculata is a species of flowering plant in the Bonnetiaceae family. It is found only in Venezuela.

References

fasciculata
Endemic flora of Venezuela
Near threatened plants
Taxonomy articles created by Polbot